The War at Home is an American sitcom created by Rob Lotterstein that ran from September 11, 2005, to April 22, 2007, on Fox. It follows the antics of a largely dysfunctional Long Island family. The show ran for two seasons, but was not renewed for a third season.

Plot 
The show depicts the daily lives of Dave and Vicky and their three children, Hillary, Larry, and Mike, on Long Island, New York, dealing with normal family issues. Dave is a middle class Jewish insurance salesman. He is often portrayed as insensitive and cynical, and sometimes as a paranoid, overprotective and hypocritical bigot. His family (especially Larry) find it difficult to accept his behavior. Dave is constantly scolded and insulted (and even punched once) by Larry for always picking on him. It is established toward the end of season one that Dave is the way he is because he had a father who constantly badgered him. Dave's wife Vicky is an attractive Italian-American Catholic part-time receptionist at a doctors' office. Generally levelheaded, she usually spends her time dealing with Dave's unreasonable behavior, but can be quite obnoxious herself.

Of their three children, the oldest is Hillary (Kaylee DeFer), a typical 17-year-old who frequently misbehaves, trying to get away with bad behavior behind the backs of her parents, who often regard her with suspicion. Second oldest is 16-year-old Larry (Kyle Sullivan), an odd misfit given to emotional outbursts (such as when Vicky denies him permission to see Brian Boitano star as Bilbo Baggins in The Lord of the Rings On Ice). Larry is often seen with his best friend Kenny (Rami Malek). Initially Dave believes that the boys are both gay, but it is later revealed to the audience that while Larry is not gay, Kenny has a secret crush on Larry. Dave, and to a lesser extent Vicky, often treat Larry's flamboyancy with wary eyes. The youngest child, the pubescent 14-year-old Mike (Dean Collins), must deal with issues such as masturbation, dating and underage gambling. His character is portrayed as tougher and more cynical than Larry's.

The series frequently breaks the fourth wall between segments of an episode, during which Dave or other characters deliver a rant or other comment directly relating to the scene.

Cast and characters 
 Michael Rapaport as David "Dave" Gold
 Anita Barone as Victoria "Vicky" Gold
 Kyle Sullivan as Lawrence Allen "Larry" Gold
 Kaylee DeFer as Hillary Gold
 Dean Collins as Michael "Mike" Gold
 Rami Malek as Khaleel Nazeeh "Kenny" Al-Bahir

Series overview

Episodes

Season 1 (2005–06)

Season 2 (2006–07)

Reception

Critical response 
The show originally received negative reviews from critics, scoring a 28 out of 100 on Metacritic and 24% on Rotten Tomatoes. It received critical acclaim during its second season for its handling of Kenny's "coming out" story arc, including a Humanitas Prize nomination for Lotterstein, as well as a GLAAD Media Award nomination for "Outstanding Comedy Series".

Ratings

Awards and nominations

Home media

References

External links
 

2000s American sitcoms
2005 American television series debuts
2007 American television series endings
English-language television shows
2000s American LGBT-related comedy television series
Fox Broadcasting Company original programming
Jewish comedy and humor
Television series by Warner Bros. Television Studios
Television shows set in New York (state)
Television series about dysfunctional families
Religious comedy television series
American LGBT-related sitcoms